The Papeete was a schooner built in 1891 by Matthew Turner, a San Francisco Bay Area shipbuilder who had extensive business interests in Tahiti. The ship was known for a fast passage from San Francisco to Tahiti of 17 days.

She was built to serve in the packet trade, as was the similarly named barquentine City of Papeete.

Schooner Papeete was still afloat in 1929.

References

Schooners
Two-masted ships
Ships built in Benicia, California
History of Tahiti
Passenger ships of France
Merchant ships of France
1891 ships
Transport in French Polynesia